Annowo may refer to:

Annowo, Grudziądz County in Kuyavian-Pomeranian Voivodeship (north-central Poland)
Annowo, Gmina Gąsawa in Kuyavian-Pomeranian Voivodeship (north-central Poland)
Annowo, Gmina Łabiszyn in Kuyavian-Pomeranian Voivodeship (north-central Poland)
Annowo, Włocławek County in Kuyavian-Pomeranian Voivodeship (north-central Poland)
Annowo, Masovian Voivodeship (east-central Poland)
Annowo, Greater Poland Voivodeship (west-central Poland)